Punta Cana is a resort town in the easternmost region of the Dominican Republic. It is part of the Veron–Punta Cana municipal district, in the Higüey municipality of La Altagracia Province. According to the 2010 census, this district had a population of 43,982 inhabitants.

Punta Cana is the second-most popular tourist destination in Latin America, with more visitors than any other city in the Caribbean region. The Punta Cana International Airport (PUJ) is located about 3 km inland, on the highway that leads from Higüey to La Romana. This airport receives 64% of all flights that arrive in the Dominican Republic, receiving more passengers than the Las Américas International Airport, located in Santo Domingo, the country's capital.

The area is known for its white sand beaches, blue turquoise waters, and balnearios which face both the Caribbean Sea and the Atlantic Ocean. The weather is hot for most of the year, especially in late summer and autumn when the Northern Tropics receive their most direct sunlight.

Geography and climate

The Punta Cana area has an estimated population of 100,000, with an annual growth rate of 11% as of 2011. To the north, it borders the village and beach of Cabeza de Toro, and the Bávaro and El Cortecito beaches. European entrepreneurs, particularly Spanish hotel chains, own all but two of the over 50 megaresorts at the Punta Cana tourism destination.

The province’s  coastline tends to be mildly windy. The ocean waters are mainly shallows, with several natural marine pools in which visitors can bathe without danger. From north to south, the main beaches are Uvero Alto, Macao, Arena Gorda, Bávaro, El Cortecito, Las Corales, and Cabeza de Toro, all north of the cape; and Cabo Engaño, Punta Cana, and Juanillo south of the cape.

Bávaro is the area starting from Cabeza de Toro until Macao Beach. As the hotels started to rise along the east coast, Bavaro itself became a center of services with shopping malls, fast-food stores, drug stores, fine restaurants, banks, clinics, workshops, supermarkets, and schools. The major town in the district is Veron, now bigger than Higüey in territory, a spontaneous – and poor – urban development running along the original road from the west. Verón, last name of the French proprietor of a timberline business in the early 1930s, is now the base-city for hotel workers and related.

Punta Cana Village, with a population of about 3,000, is being developed by a master plan of the Punta Cana Group. In 1969 the area was purchased by this organization and development began in the following decades. The main avenue, Boulevard Primero de Noviembre, is lined with low office buildings. Branching off are streets with gated communities on both sides. To the east are single family residences. Small apartment buildings are to the west. A shopping area is near the airport and beyond the apartment houses is a mall and several stores. East of the village is the Westin Resort and golf course by the ocean. There is a public beach, Playa Blanca, with a shuttle bus from the Village's sole hotel. An upscale planned community, Cap Cana, is south of Punta Cana Village.

Climate 
Punta Cana features a tropical wet and dry climate under the Köppen climate classification. The hot and humid season lasts from May to October, and during the day temperatures might reach .

History and development
In the late 1960s, Frank Rainieri, a Dominican entrepreneur in his 20s and Theodore Kheel, a high-powered New York attorney and labor mediator teamed up with other investors, to acquire a 58-million square meter lot on the eastern end of the Dominican Republic. The area that is known today as Punta Cana was mostly an undeveloped coastal area of La Altagracia province. At the time the closest major city, Higüey, was a 5-hour drive. Their first project was a 40 guest hotel called the Punta Cana Club. In 1970, Rainieri changed the original name of the place, Yauya or Punta Borrachos, for Punta Cana. In 1978, the Paris Mediterranean Club joined the Grupo Punta Cana SA project, building a 350-room hotel within the project. Later, the Barceló and Newco Group settled in the Bavaro area.

In 1979, the Hotel Puntacana was built and then in 1984, the Punta Cana International Airport was inaugurated, while more infrastructures such as highways were developed. In 1993, construction began on the Marina de Punta Cana Resort & Club marina. In 1996, the Dominican designer Óscar de la Renta and the Spanish singer Julio Iglesias joined the project. In 2000, the first of the residential community developments began and six years later Tortuga Bay opened.

Corporate environmental and social responsibilities and policies have been pursued since the resort was built. The Puntacana Foundation- made of the Ecological Foundation and Community Services- has a 1,500-acre reserve that now serves as a research base for universities and a sanctuary for endangered species and has opened two schools- the Ann & Ted Kheel Polytechnic and the Puntacana International School- and a free health clinic in the local community of Véron.

Bavaro area
Bávaro was conceived as a town for the workers of the Punta Cana tourist complex, but it has been transformed into an important center for tourist services after the hotel expansion to the north of Punta Cana around Bávaro beach. Throughout the area there are dozens of hotels such as Riu, Iberostar, Be Live Grand Punta Cana, Meliá, Barceló, Palladium, Catalonia or Bahía Príncipe. The area also has several nightclubs such as: Oro at Hard Rock Hotel, Imagine, and Coco Bongo or Pachá.

Numerous tourist attractions have been installed, some of a certain size such as the Manatí Park in Bávaro, a water park with manatees, dolphins and other kinds of animals. For tourists, the Punta Cana beach area is more popular because it is more affordable at international prices. Among the best-known digital magazines and newspapers in the entire eastern area are: BavaroDigital and BavaroMagazine.

Bavaro is connected by road with Higüey and La Otra Banda. It extends about 15 km north to Playa Macao. Other nearby beaches are: Uvero Alto, Roco Ki and La Vacama. Bavaro has 10 km of beaches. The XII Ibero-American Summit was held on this site on November 15 and 16, 2002, where the heads of state and government of 21 Spanish and Portuguese-speaking nations met.

Population 

The area has a low population density with the majority of the inhabitants being Haitian migrant workers. In 2010, Haitians represented 81.1 percent of the total population.

Infrastructure

Transportation 

The Punta Cana International Airport is the primary airport. In 2014, Punta Cana received over 2.4 million passengers, making it the second-busiest airport in the Caribbean. Grupo Puntacana built the Punta Cana International Airport in 1984 to facilitate tourism in the area. It was the western hemisphere’s first privately owned international airport.

Electricity 
The electricity is powered by Consorcio Energetico Punta Cana Macao (CEPM), a fossil fuel, renewable, and biomass energy producer led by US-based Argentine businessman Rolando Gonzalez-Bunster.

Tourism 
Punta Cana is a tourist destination, and the area is a key contributor to tourism in the Dominican Republic.

Activities and landmarks 
Many of the excursions in Punta Cana are near the water, it being a beach destination. These activities include snorkeling, windsurfing, banana boat rides, speedboats, scuba diving, catamaran cruises, party boats, deep sea fishing, as well as swimming with dolphins and sharks and snorkeling with stingrays. For visitors who prefer to see more of the Dominican countryside, there are land-based excursions such as safari tours, horseback riding and dune buggies.

Visiting the Dominican Republic's smaller Caribbean islands of Saona and Catalina is a day trip from Punta Cana. The capital city Santo Domingo, and Los Haitises National Park, Samaná, are within a couple of hours. The Basilica Catholic Monument, built in 1962 and designed by two French architects, is in nearby Higüey, the 500-year-old capital of the province.

Hotels and resorts 

Punta Cana has a number of luxury resorts.

Diving 
Because of its location at the Caribbean Sea, diving is one of the tourist activities. The marine area surrounding Punta Cana was declared a marine reserve in 2012.

Safety 
Punta Cana received negative publicity in the summer of 2019 for a series of American tourist deaths. Initially these deaths were reported as “mysterious,” with tainted alcohol and pesticides being rumored as possible reasons. However, with the help of the FBI and United States Department of State, it was found via toxicology reports that the deaths were from natural causes. To further ensure travelers that Punta Cana safety is of the highest priority, a consortium of 50 hotels developed the Punta Cana Promise which reaffirms their commitment to a set of safety and security guidelines.

Punta Cana is generally a very safe travel destination. With regards to unnatural deaths of Americans, Jamaica and the Bahamas are just two destinations in the Caribbean which are more dangerous. Car accidents and drowning are the two leading causes of unnatural deaths to Americans in the Dominican Republic.

Other safety issues to keep in mind include natural disasters such as hurricanes, disease such as the Zika Virus and minor tourist scams.

Marine biodiversity 
The following species have been registered in the waters around Punta Cana:

Satellite images

See also 

 Puntacana Resort and Club
 Dominican Republic Real Estate

References

Bibliography

External links 

 

Populated places in La Altagracia Province
Resorts in the Dominican Republic
Underwater diving sites in the Caribbean